The 1913–14 season was the fifth year of football played by Dundee Hibernian, and covers the period from 1 July 1913 to 30 June 1914.

Match results
Dundee Hibernian played a total of 23 matches during the 1913–14 season.

Legend

All results are written with Dundee Hibernian's score first.
Own goals in italics

Second Division

Scottish Cup

References

Dundee United F.C. seasons
Dundee Hibernian